Niloufar, Nilophur, Nelofar, Nilofar, Nilufar, Niloofar, or Neiloufar (Persian: نیلوفر), meaning blue lotus, Nymphaea or water lily, is a female given name of Persian origin and may refer to:

People
 Niloufar Bayani, (born 1986), Iranian wildlife conservation biology researcher and activist.
 Nilüfer Hanımsultan, (born 1916), Princess of Turkey by birth and princess of Hyderabad State by marriage.
 Niloofar Beyzaie (born 1967), Iranian dramaturge, theatre director and playwright
 Nelofer Pazira (born 1973), Canadian filmmaker, author, and journalist
 Nilofar Bakhtiar (born 1957), Pakistani politician and public official
 Nilofar Sakhi, Afghan women's rights activist
 Nilofar Suhrawardy, Indian journalist and author
 Niloufar Ardalan, (born 1985), Iranian footballer, captain of the Iranian national women's football team
 Niloufar Talebi, British-born Iranian-American author, literary translator, and multidisciplinary artist
 Neelofa Noor, (born 1989), Malaysian actress, television host
 Nelufar Hedayat, (born 1988), British journalist and presenter
 Nilufar Mamadalieva, biochemist from Uzbekistan
 Nilufar Usmonova, Uzbek singer and actress
 Nilufar Yasmin, Bangladeshi singer

Places
Sarab-e Nilufar, village in Baladarband Rural District, in the Central District of Kermanshah County, Kermanshah Province, Iran
Shahrak-e Sarab Nilufar, village in Baladarband Rural District, in the Central District of Kermanshah County, Kermanshah Province, Iran

Movies
 Niloofar, a 2008 Iranian movie
 Neelofar, a Pakistani movie

Other uses
 Cyclone Nilofar, a 2014 storm

See also
 Nilüfer (disambiguation), the Turkish version of the name

Feminine given names
Given names derived from plants or flowers